Gerald Sternberg (born March 18, 1943) is a former Canadian football player who played for the Montreal Alouettes, Toronto Argonauts and Hamilton Tiger-Cats. He won the Grey Cup with Hamilton in 1972. He played college football at the University of Toronto.

References

1943 births
Living people
Canadian football defensive backs
Jewish Canadian sportspeople
Hamilton Tiger-Cats players
Montreal Alouettes players
Soviet emigrants to Canada
Toronto Argonauts players
Toronto Varsity Blues football players